John Hansen (born 14 September 1973) is a Danish former professional footballer who played as a midfielder for OB, Esbjerg fB and Cambridge United.

References

Danish men's footballers
Odense Boldklub players
Esbjerg fB players
Cambridge United F.C. players
Danish Superliga players
English Football League players
1973 births
Living people
Danish expatriate men's footballers
Expatriate footballers in England
Association football midfielders